Charles A. Heimbold Jr. (born May 27, 1933) is an American businessman and diplomat, who was Chairman and CEO of Bristol-Myers Squibb Company, and as U.S. Ambassador to Sweden. His son is American musician Pete Francis Heimbold, of Dispatch fame.

Biography
He is an honors graduate of Villanova University, having graduated in 1954, and of the University of Pennsylvania Law School in 1960, where he was a member of the University of Pennsylvania Law Review. He also received a Master of Laws degree from New York University and completed a program at The Hague Academy of International Law in the summer of 1959.

Heimbold served as Chairman and CEO of Bristol-Myers Squibb Company.

Heimbold was nominated by President George W. Bush as U.S. Ambassador to Sweden on April 13, 2001. He was confirmed by the U.S. Senate on August 1, and sworn in on September 12 in New York City. Heimbold presented his credentials to King Carl XVI Gustaf in Stockholm on September 26, 2001.

His son is American musician Pete Francis Heimbold, of Dispatch fame.

Charles ("Chuck") W. Mooney Jr. is the Charles A. Heimbold, Jr. Professor of Law at the University of Pennsylvania Law School.

References

Sources
 Charles A. Heimbold, Jr., Former U.S. Ambassador to Sweden
 A Brief History of Bristol-Myers Squibb

Ambassadors of the United States to Sweden
Villanova University alumni
New York University alumni
Living people
1933 births
University of Pennsylvania Law School alumni